Main Kaun Hoon is a Hindi song from 2017 film Secret Superstar. Meghna Mishra won Film of India Online Award for Best Female Playback Singer for the song and nominated for Screen Awards. It is written by Kausar Munir and composed by Amit Trivedi with Aamir Khan. The song was released as a single on 23 August 2017 and the music video was released on 25 August. Both were nominated for Screen Awards. The song was picked as one of the best Hindi songs of 2017 by an online portal.

For the film's China release, a Mandarin Chinese version of the song was released on 17 January 2018, and sung by actor-singer Huang Bo. He was previously Aamir Khan's voice actor for the Mandarin dub of 3 Idiots.

Awards

References

Indian songs
Hindi-language songs
Hindi film songs